Radnor Township may refer to:

Canada
 Radnor Township, Quebec

United States
 Radnor Township, Peoria County, Illinois
 Radnor Township, Delaware County, Ohio
 Radnor Township, Delaware County, Pennsylvania

Township name disambiguation pages